The Oakland Golden Grizzlies are the women's basketball team that represent Oakland University in Rochester, Michigan, United States. The school's team competes in the Horizon League and plays their home games at the Athletics Center O'rena.

History
The Golden Grizzlies began play in 1974. As of the end of the 2015–16 season, they have an all-time record of 756–434. During their time in Division II (playing in the GLIAC), they qualified for the respective Tournament in 1982, 1983, 1989, 1990, 1994, 1995, 1996, and 1997. They finished as regular season champion in the GLIAC in 1982, 1983, 1989, 1990, 1994, with a Division title in 1997. They have qualified for the NCAA tournament twice, in 2002 and 2006 (both times after winning the Summit League tournament (formerly known as the Mid-Con). Both times they lost in the first round, losing 63–38 to Vanderbilt and 68–45 to Ohio State, respectively.

Postseason results
The Golden Grizzlies, then known as the Pioneers, had a 10–10 record in eight NCAA Tournament appearances at the Division II level.

NCAA Division II tournament results

NCAA Division I Tournament results

References

External links